Großröhrsdorf is a town in the district of Bautzen, in the eastern part of Saxony, Germany. It is situated 12 km west of Bischofswerda, and 22 km northeast of Dresden. The town extends for about 4 km along the old post road that runs through it.

References 

Populated places in Bautzen (district)